Urlândia  is a bairro in the District of Sede in the municipality of Santa Maria, in the Brazilian state of Rio Grande do Sul. It is located in south Santa Maria.

Villages 
The bairro contains the following villages: Parque Residencial São Carlos, Urlândia, Vila Formosa, Vila Santos, Vila Tropical, Vila Urlândia.

References 

Bairros of Santa Maria, Rio Grande do Sul